The intercity baseball tournament (都市対抗野球大会 Toshi Taikō yakyū taikai) of Japan, commonly known as "Summer All-star" (真夏の球宴 manatsu no kyūen), is an annual nationwide inter-city baseball tournament in Japan. The winners are awarded the "Black Lion Flag" (黒獅子旗 kurojishi ki), runners-up are awarded the "White Lion Flag" (白獅子旗 shirojishi ki).

Winners 
A bracket after city and team in champion column indicates number of titles.

(baseball team) links to Japanese wikipedia article except club team and team does not have an article.

Note

References

External links 
Japan Amateur Baseball Association (Japanese)

Baseball competitions in Japan